Laban is a French surname. It may refer to:

Places
 Laban-e Olya, a village in Iran
 Laban-e Sofla, a village in Iran
 Laban, Virginia, an unincorporated community in the United States
 8539 Laban, main-belt asteroid

People

Surname
Ahmad Abu Laban (1946–2007), Danish imam
Arthur Laban Bates (1859–1934), American politician and representative for Pennsylvania
Joseph Laban, Filipino journalist and filmmaker
Josh Laban (born 1982), Olympic swimmer for U.S. Virgin Islands
Maurice Laban (1914–1956), founding member of the Algerian Communist Party
Olivier Laban-Mattei (b. 1977), French documentary photographer
Rudolf von Laban, dancer and dance theorist who devised Laban Movement Analysis
Theodore H. Laban (1914–1978), American World War II airman
Vincent Laban (born 1984), French footballer
Winnie Laban (born 1955), New Zealand politician

Forename
 Laban (Bible), a figure in the Book of Genesis
 Laban (Book of Mormon), a figure in the Book of Mormon
Charles Laban Abernethy (1872–1955), American politician and congressman for North Carolina
Laban Ainsworth (1757–1858), American pastor
Laban Chege (born 1969), Kenyan long-distance runner
Laban Coblentz (born 1961), American writer and entrepreneur
Laban Jackson (born 1943), American businessman
Laban Kagika (born 1978), Kenyan marathon runner
Laban Moiben (born 1983), Kenyan marathon runner
Laban T. Moore (1829–1892), American politician and representative for Kentucky
Laban Lacy Rice (1870–1973), American educator and author
Laban Rotich (born 1969), Kenyan 1500 metres runner
Laban Wheaton (1754–1846), American politician and representative for Massachusetts

Other uses
 Laban ng Demokratikong Pilipino (Struggle of Democratic Filipinos), a political party in the Philippines
 Lakas ng Bayan (People's Power), a former political party in the Philippines that was known by the acronym, LABAN (meaning "Fight")
 Laban sign, a Filipino hand gesture
 Laban (band), a 1980s Eurodance duo
 Leben (milk product), buttermilk commonly referred to as laban in the Arabian Peninsula
 Yogurt in Levantine and Iraqi Arabic
 Laban Movement Analysis, a system for describing movement

See also
 Lilla spöket Laban (The Little Ghost Godfrey), a Swedish children's book character
 Trinity Laban Conservatoire of Music and Dance, a college in southeast London named after Rudolf Laban